

Stanley Thomas Bindoff (1908–1980) was an English historian who specialised in the Tudor and Elizabethan periods. He was the first professor of history at Queen Mary College, University of London. He was the editor of The History of Parliament for the parliaments of 1509–1558, published in 1982.

Selected publications
 Geyl, Pieter. The Netherlands Divided, 1609–1648 ... (Based on Geschiedenis van de Nederlandsche Stam.) Williams & Norgate, London, 1936. (Translator)
 The Scheldt Question to 1839, etc. G. Allen & Unwin, London, 1945.
 Ket's Rebellion 1549. George Philip & Son, London, 1949.
 Tudor England. Penguin Books, Harmondsworth, 1950.
 The fame of Sir Thomas Gresham. Jonathan Cape, London, 1973. (Neale lecture in English history No. 4) 
 The House of Commons, 1509–1558. Secker & Warburg, London, 1982. (Editor)

References

Further reading
 Ives E.W. and R.J. Knecht. (1978) Wealth and Power in Tudor England: Essays Presented to S. T. Bindoff. London: Athlone Press.

External links
http://www.ukwhoswho.com/view/article/oupww/whowaswho/U152327
https://archiveshub.jisc.ac.uk/search/archives/a1915800-50d7-3e41-bb86-cf31803f5b63
http://www.oxforddnb.com/view/article/58737

1908 births
1980 deaths
English historians
People educated at Brighton, Hove and Sussex Grammar School
Alumni of University College London
Academics of University College London
Royal Navy officers of World War II
Academics of Queen Mary University of London
Deaths from pneumonia in England
Deaths from bronchopneumonia
People from Hove